Kuban Resort and Aquapark is a 4-stars hotel with integrated aquapark and at 80 meters the highest building in Bulgarian Sunny Beach resort.

It is also the 18th highest building in Bulgaria.

The aquapark includes 3 connected swimming pools, 7 water slides, etc.

See also 
List of tallest buildings in Bulgaria

References

External links 
Homepage
Location on Google Maps.

Skyscrapers in Bulgaria
Hotels in Sunny Beach
Water parks in Bulgaria